Metrosideros colensoi, the climbing rata or Colenso's rātā, is a forest liane or vine that is endemic to New Zealand. It is one of a number of New Zealand Metrosideros species which live out their lives as vines, unlike the northern rata (M.robusta), which generally begins as a hemi-epiphyte before growing  into a huge tree. It grows to around 6 metres in height and bears clusters of pink or white flowers. It is unusual amongst New Zealand's metrosideros species in that its branches display a weeping habit, forming a 'hanging curtain' appearance. This behaviour is uncommon in New Zealand native plants. The name commemorates William Colenso, an early Cornish Christian missionary who was one of the great characters of New Zealand botany.

Description
The flowers of Colenso's rātā are either white or pale pink, and flowering is usually from November until January. Foliage is a dark green colour, with new years growth appearing in a contrasting lighter green. It is usual to find the vine form of rātā climbing up other forest trees, however Colenso's rātā is also partial to limestone cliff faces where it can climb cliffs relatively undisturbed. It is found within lowland forest as far south as Greymouth and Kaikoura.

Conservation
As of 2012, Metrosideros colensoi is not regarded as threatened.

Cultivation
Metrosideros colensoi is a notable plant in cultivation, but considerably undervalued. However, it is in several ways superior to more commonly grown species, such as Metrosideros carminea, on account of the ordered appearance of its growth form, and the 'movement' conveyed by its downward arching branches.

See also 
 Carmine/Crimson Rātā
 Large White Rātā
 Scarlet Rātā
 Small White Rātā
 White Rātā

References

Further reading
Salmon, J.T., 1986. The Native Trees of New Zealand. Wellington: Heinneman Reed.
Simpson, P., 2005. Pōhutukawa & Rātā: New Zealand's Iron-Hearted Trees. Wellington: Te Papa Press.

External links

	

colensoi
Endemic flora of New Zealand
Trees of New Zealand
Garden plants of New Zealand